2300 Jackson Street is the sixteenth and final studio album by American group the Jacksons, and their final album for record label Epic, released in the United States on May 28, 1989.

This is the group's first and only album produced without Michael and Marlon, both of whom left the group following the conclusion of their 1984 Victory Tour (although both appear on the title track). The group's final album peaked at No. 59 on the US Billboard Top Pop Albums chart and at No. 14 on the US Top Black Albums chart, and would sell over half a million copies worldwide.

Overview
In a Billboard story June 17, 1989 about the release of 2300 Jackson Street, Jackie Jackson was quoted saying "After the Victory album, our backs were against the wall...At first no one at CBS paid us any attention..." When the label heard "Alright With Me" and "If You'd Only Believe", they flew promotion staff for a meeting at Tito's Los Angeles home studio in a show of support. 

The management firm of Fitzgerald-Hartley heard the album and approached the group about management. They had not managed a black act since the Brothers Johnson. Comparing the Jacksons' without Michael to their former clients Rufus without Chaka Khan, they were quoted saying "People quickly forget the group factor, which is what makes it all happen." 

For the recording of 2300 Jackson Street, Michael recorded his vocals at the Encino house and Janet recorded her vocals at Marlon's home studio.

After the first week of release, the single "Nothin' (That Compares 2 U)" received playlist adds from 84% of black radio.

Critical reception 
The album received praise from music critics.

Track listing

Personnel

Production
Production: Michael Omartian , L.A. Reid and Babyface , Jermaine Jackson , The Jacksons , Teddy Riley and Gene Griffin , Attala Zane Giles 
Arrangements: Michael Omartian , L.A. Reid and Babyface , Jermaine Jackson , The Jacksons , Teddy Riley , Attala Zane Giles 
Engineers: David Alhert , Jon Gass , Mark Richmond , Mike Couzzi , Dennis Mitchell , Jeff Lorenzen , Larry Fergusson , Marlon Jackson , Susan Rogers , Robert Brown , Keith Cohen 
Assistant engineers: Pee Wee Jackson , Donnell Sullivan , Mike Spring , Jim Hanneman , Joe Schiff , Terry Christian 
Mixing: Keith Cohen , L.A. Reid and Babyface , Jackie Jackson , Susan Rogers , Larry Fergusson , Dennis Mitchell , Michael Omartian

Musicians

Babyface - keyboards and guitar (2)
Ran Ballard - synthesizer programming (6, 9)
Eugene A. Booker, Jr. - keyboards (3, 8)
Alex Brown - backing vocals (4, 8, 10)
Austin Brown - backing vocals (5)
Stacee Brown - backing vocals (5)
Yashi Brown - backing vocals (5)
Erich Bulling - drum programming (1, 3, 8, 11), synthesizer programming (1, 3, 4, 8), effects (8), synthesizer (11)
Paulinho da Costa - percussion (3, 9, 10)
Lynn Davis - backing vocals (4, 10)
Nathan East - bass (9)
Chuck Findley - trumpet (9)
Attala Zane Giles - drum programming and bass synthesizer (6, 9), keyboards and synthesizer programming (9, 10)
Ray Grady - dialogue (1)
Gary Grant - trumpet (9)
Daniel Higgins - tenor saxophone (9)
Autumn Joi Jackson - backing vocals (5)
Brandi Jackson - backing vocals (5)
Brittny Jackson - backing vocals (5)
Jackie Jackson - lead vocals (5, 8, 10, 11), backing vocals (1, 2, 6, 7, 9-11), percussion (10), finger snaps (11)
Jaimy Jackson - backing vocals (5)
Janet Jackson - lead vocals (5)
Jeremy Jackson - backing vocals (5)
Jermaine Jackson - lead vocals (1-6, 8-11), backing vocals (1-4, 6-11), percussion (3), fingers snaps (11)
Jermaine Jackson, Jr. - backing vocals (5)
Jourdynn Jackson - backing vocals (5)
Marlon Jackson - lead vocals (5)
Marlon Jackson, Jr. - backing vocals (5)
Michael Jackson - lead vocals (5)
Paul Jackson, Jr. - guitar (1, 3-5, 8-11)
Randy Jackson - lead vocals (2, 5, 7), backing vocals (1, 2, 6, 7, 9-11)
Rebbie Jackson - lead vocals (5)
Siggy Jackson - backing vocals (5)
Taj Jackson - backing vocals (5)
Taryll Jackson - backing vocals (5)
TJ Jackson - backing vocals (5)
Tito Jackson - lead vocals (1, 5), backing vocals (1, 2, 4, 6, 7, 9-11), motorcycle effects (6)
Valencia Jackson - backing vocals (5)
Rhett Lawrence - Fairlight programming (5)
Julius W. Linsey - synthesizer (6)
Jeff Lorber - synthesizer, drum programming and synthesizer programming (6), overdub keyboards (8)
Jonathan Moffett - drums (8, 9)
Don Myrick - saxophone (5)
Michael Omartian - keyboards (1, 4), drum programming (4), piano (11), synthesizer programming (11), finger snaps (11)
Lee Oskar - harmonica (3)
Donald Parks - synthesizer programming (2)
Jeff Porcaro - drums and drum programming (10)
Bill Reichenbach Jr. - trombone (9)
L.A. Reid - drums and percussion (2)
Teddy Riley - instruments (5, 7)
Gene Thomason - motorcycle effects (6)
Larry Williams - saxophone (1, 4, 9), horn programming (8), horn arrangements (9)

Charts

References 

1989 albums
The Jackson 5 albums
Albums produced by Teddy Riley
Albums produced by Michael Omartian
Epic Records albums